The Odessa Meteor Crater is a meteorite crater in the southwestern part of Ector County, southwest of the city of Odessa of West Texas, United States. This is one of three impact crater sites found in Texas, the others being the older and much larger Sierra Madera crater and the Marquez crater.

The Handbook of Texas Online describes the Odessa meteor crater as the largest of several smaller craters in the immediate area that were formed by the impact of thousands of octahedrites (an iron metallic type) that fell in prehistoric times.

The web site of the University of Texas of the Permian Basin (UTPB, Center for Energy and Economic Diversification), identifies five craters at the Odessa site and shows a distribution map of the meteorite fragments recovered from the area. The recoveries have generally come from an area to the north and northwest of the main crater site, with only a few found to the south. They indicate that the structure of the main crater, because it was one of the earliest to be recognized and studied, is now used to name similar impact sites on a worldwide basis. The site has been designated as a National Natural Landmark by the National Park Service, and a small information area and nature trail has been set up on-site for a self-guided tour.

The crater itself and the museum curator, Tom Rodman, were featured in the June 1, 2013 broadcast of Bob Phillips's syndicated television series Texas Country Reporter.

See also

Impact crater
List of impact craters in North America
Marquez crater

Meteor Crater
Monahans Sandhills State Park
Sierra Madera crater

References

External links

Odessa Meteor Crater and Museum website
UTPB Center for Energy and Economic Diversifications, Odessa Meteor Craters
Mindat.org - Odessa Craters, Odessa, Ector Co., Texas, USA
Article about the crater
Photos of West Texas and the Llano Estacado
Video of the main crater site.

Protected areas of Ector County, Texas
Geology museums in the United States
Impact craters of the United States
Museums in Ector County, Texas
Natural history museums in Texas
Pleistocene impact craters
Landforms of Ector County, Texas
National Natural Landmarks in Texas